Thomas Hoskyns Leonard (born 1948) is a British statistician and author. Originally from Devon, he studied for and obtained a doctorate in Statistics at the University of London. He went on to work at the University of Warwick and the University of Wisconsin-Madison, before taking up the Chair of Statistics at the University of Edinburgh.

In 1972, Leonard co-founded the Department of Statistics at the University of Warwick with P.Jeffrey Harrison and Robin Reed, where he helped to design the undergraduate MORSE degree in Mathematics, Operations Research, Statistics and Economics.

During Leonard's tenure(1980-1995) in the Department of Statistics at the University of Wisconsin-Madison, he is reported as improving the Bayesian components of both the teaching and research programs, with his colleagues Kam Wah Tsui and Michael Newton

Retiring in 2001, he still lives in Edinburgh and continues to write on and engage with statistics.

Leonard has published on the Bayesian approach to categorical data analysis, as well as on function smoothing and prior informative density estimation, conditional Laplacian approximations for marginal inference and prediction, and the statistical modelling of log covariance matrices. He is also known for his work concerning the applications of Bayesian methodology in geophysics, medicine, psychometrics and the provision of statistical expertise in legal cases. He was one of the founders, in 1992, of the International Society for Bayesian Analysis, alongside Arnold Zellner and Gordon Kaufman, and has published a history of the Bayesian approach.

Leonard is the co- author of   Bayesian Methods: An analysis for Statisticians and Interdisciplinary Researchers with John S. J. Hsu   and author of  the sci-fi socio-political satire 'The Grand Oligarchs of Qinsatorix'.

Leonard's collaboration at the University of Edinburgh with Ian Main, Orestis Papasouliotis and their co-authors led to several publications in Geophysics

During December 2016, Leonard's interview by Diego Andres  Peres  Ruiz was published by the Bulletin of the International Society for Bayesian Analysis.

Notes

References
 
 ISBA History and Meetings
 A personal history of Bayesian statistics, by Thomas H. Leonard (StatsLife)
 The Life of a Bayesian Boy: An interview with Thomas Hoskyns Leonard (Statistics Views)

Living people
Bayesian statisticians
British statisticians
1948 births